Schepsel Schaffer (May 4, 1862 – September 28, 1933) was an American rabbi.

Biography
Schepsel Schaffer was born on the first day of Shavuot, 5622, in Bausk, Courland. On his mother's side he was a descendant of Mordecai Jaffe, author of the Lebush. He was educated at the gymnasium of Libau, Courland, at the University of Berlin, and at the Rabbinical Seminary of Berlin.

In January 1893, Schaffer became rabbi of Congregation Shearith Israel in Baltimore, Maryland. He was president of the Baltimore Zion Association (from 1895) and honorary vice-president of the American Federation of Zionists, and he was twice a delegate to the Zionist Congress at Basel.

Publications

References
 

1862 births
1933 deaths
19th-century American rabbis
20th-century American rabbis
American Zionists
Emigrants from the Russian Empire to the United States
Humboldt University of Berlin alumni
Jews and Judaism in Baltimore
People from Bauska
People from Courland Governorate
Religious leaders from Baltimore